Martin Heix (September 2, 1903 – April 24, 1977) was a German politician of the Christian Democratic Union (CDU) and former member of the German Bundestag.

Life 
After the Second World War he participated in the foundation of the CDU in Oberhausen, of which he was chairman from 1946 to 1962. Heix was a member of the appointed state parliament of North Rhine-Westphalia in 1946/47, which drafted the state constitution. From 1949 to 1965 he was a member of the German Bundestag. In the elections of 1949, 1957 and 1961 he won the direct mandate in the constituency of Oberhausen. From 1956 he was also a member of the Defence Committee of the German Bundestag.

Literature

References

1903 births
1977 deaths
Members of the Bundestag for North Rhine-Westphalia
Members of the Bundestag 1961–1965
Members of the Bundestag 1957–1961
Members of the Bundestag 1953–1957
Members of the Bundestag 1949–1953
Members of the Bundestag for the Christian Democratic Union of Germany
Members of the Landtag of North Rhine-Westphalia